Gerba may refer to:

 Gerba, a synonym for the moth genus Eudesmia
 Gerba, historic name of the Tunisian island of Djerba
 Gerba, ancient Roman name of Houmt El Souk on the island of Djerba
 Gerba Guracha. a town in central Ethiopia

People
 Ali Gerba (born 1981), Cameroonian footballer
 Amina Gerba (born 1961), Cameroonian–Canadian businesswoman and entrepreneur
 Charles P. Gerba, American microbiologist